Duzduzan (also Romanized as Dūzdūzān) is a city in Mehraban District of Sarab County, East Azerbaijan province, Iran. At the 2006 census, its population was 3,557 in 664 households. The following census in 2011 counted 3,815 people in 897 households. The latest census in 2016 showed a population of 3,627 people in 1,065 households.

Geography
Duzduzan is located in the mountains of Arasbaran in north-western Iran on the highway between Ardabil and Tabriz. Although not on the river it is within the drainage basin of the Aji Chay. Because of its high elevation it has a climate that is generally cold and rainy.  The city is 15 km by road east of the village of Kurdkandi and 32 km by road east of Bostanabad. Duzduzan is 37 km by road west of the city of Sarab, the county seat.

Earthquakes
The area is earthquake-prone as it lies on the Duzduzan Fault, in the North Tabriz fault system, just north of the plate boundary where the Arabian Plate is pushing against the Eurasian Plate.  The town was heavily shaken in:
 1721 by the Shebli earthquake (7.3 MW) 
 1780 by the Tabriz earthquake (7.4 ) 
 1786 by the Marand-Mishu earthquake (6.3 ) 
 1807 by a quake on the Tasujreverse fault (5.5 ) 
 1879 by a quake on the South Bozqush reverse fault (6.7 )

References 

Sarab County

Cities in East Azerbaijan Province

Populated places in East Azerbaijan Province

Populated places in Sarab County